Battle of Los Angeles (2022) was the sixteenth Battle of Los Angeles professional wrestling tournament produced by Pro Wrestling Guerrilla (PWG). It was a two-night event which took place on January 29 and January 30, 2022 at the Globe Theatre in Los Angeles, California.

The night one of the tournament featured the first round matches of the tournament. The night two featured the quarterfinals, semifinals and final rounds of the tournament and an eight-man tag team match featuring losers of the first round matches from night one. Daniel Garcia defeated Mike Bailey in the final to win the 2022 Battle of Los Angeles.

Background
PWG postponed its planned event KOBE scheduled for March 29, 2020 due to the outbreak of the COVID-19 pandemic in the United States. On June 11, 2021, PWG announced via Twitter that it would resume holding events with Mystery Vortex 7 on August 1, the last event held being The Makings of a Varsity Athlete on December 20, 2019. On November 29, PWG announced that Battle of Los Angeles tournament would return in 2022 for the first time since 2019 and would be taking place on January 29 and January 30, 2022. The following participants would be announced for the tournament: Jonah Rock, Alex Shelley, Kevin Blackwood, Lio Rush, Black Taurus, Daniel Garcia, Jack Cartwheel, 2019 winner and PWG World Champion Bandido, Lee Moriarty, 2006 winner Davey Richards, Aramis, Jonathan Gresham, JD Drake, Rey Horus, the fictitious "Phillip Five Skulls" and Buddy Matthews. On January 11, 2022, PWG announced that the non-existent Skulls had retired and he was replaced by ″Speedball″ Mike Bailey. On January 28, Gresham withdrew from the tournament due to testing positive for COVID-19. Gresham's scheduled opponent Richards also withdrew from the tournament and both men would be replaced by Wheeler Yuta and Blake Christian, who would compete against each other.

Aftermath
After winning the 2022 Battle of Los Angeles, Garcia received a title shot against Bandido for the PWG World Championship at Delivering The Goods event on May 1, which Garcia won.

Results

Tournament brackets

†Lio Rush suffered an injury which forced him to withdraw and was replaced by his quarterfinal opponent Buddy Matthews.</onlyinclude>

References

External links
Pro Wrestling Guerrilla official website
2022 Battle of Los Angeles - First Stage
2022 Battle of Los Angeles - Final Stage

2022 in professional wrestling
Battle of Los Angeles (professional wrestling)
January 2022 events in the United States
Professional wrestling in Los Angeles
2022 in Los Angeles